Those Lips, Those Eyes is a 1980 American romance film directed by Michael Pressman and starring Frank Langella, Glynnis O'Connor, and Tom Hulce.

Plot
In the early 1950s, a star-struck Ohio boy, Artie Shoemaker, skips school to work behind the scenes for a touring stock theatrical company.

Inept at his job, Artie is nearly fired until the star of the show, Harry Crystal, takes a liking to him and takes the kid under his wing. Artie becomes smitten with one of the attractive chorus girls from the show, Ramona, a worldly young woman who provides his sexual initiation. But soon the show must move on to another town, leaving Artie alone with his dreams.

Cast
 Frank Langella as Harry Crystal
 Glynnis O'Connor as Ramona
 Tom Hulce as Artie Shoemaker
 Jerry Stiller as Mr. Shoemaker
 Herbert Berghof as Dr. Julius Fuldauer
 Kevin McCarthy as Mickey Bellinger
 Joseph Maher as Fibby Geyer
 George Morfogen as Sherman Sprat

References

External links
 
 
 

1980 films
1980s romance films
American romance films
American coming-of-age films
Films about actors
Films directed by Michael Pressman
Films produced by Steven-Charles Jaffe
Films set in the 1950s
Films set in Ohio
Films shot in Ohio
United Artists films
Films scored by Michael Small
1980s English-language films
1980s American films